Miche is an Italian bicycle component company based in San Vendemiano in the Italian Province of Treviso. It was founded by Ferdinando Michelin in 1919.

Miche's line of bicycle components is primarily focused on road cycling.  The company also produces components for track racing and sponsors the Miche cycling team.

See also

 List of bicycle parts
 List of Italian companies

References

External links 

Official website

Manufacturing companies established in 1919
Italian companies established in 1919
Companies based in Veneto
Manufacturing companies of Italy
Cycle parts manufacturers
Wheel manufacturers